All Metal Products Company was an American toy company founded in 1920 and based in Wyandotte, Michigan for most of its history. It produced inexpensive pressed metal toys under the Wyandotte brand name, and was the largest manufacturer of toy guns in the US for several decades in the 20th century. The company's slogan was "Wyandotte Toys are Good and Safe." To keep costs down, the company used scrap and surplus raw materials whenever possible, often manufacturing their toys from scrap metal obtained from local auto factories.

History

Initially, All Metal Products Company specialized in toy guns, including pop guns, water pistols, and air rifles. Their slogan in the 1920s was "Every Boy Wants a Pop Gun." By 1927 they had become the world's largest manufacturer of toy guns. Wyandotte Toys stopped manufacturing air rifles in 1929, but continued to dominate the toy gun market throughout the remainder of their history by producing pop guns, clicker pistols, dart guns and pistols, cap guns and a variety of plastic pistols. In 1929 the company added girls' toys and toy vehicles, as well as lithographed novelty toys in 1936. Metal toys were banned during World War II because the metals were needed for the war effort. The company survived by producing wooden toys and die-cut cardboard "build your own" play sets during the war. All Metal Products also manufactured en bloc clips for the M1 Garand rifle. Clips of this nature will be stamped with "AMP1" on the rear of the clip.

In 1948, die cast and plastic toys were added to the Wyandotte line, allowing it to compete with other companies who sold inexpensive dime store-type toys at lower prices than the Wyandotte pressed metal toys. In 1946, All Metal Products Company bought the Hafner Manufacturing Company, the maker of "Hafner Clockwork" pressed metal toy trains.

In the early 1950s, All Metal Products Company moved from its site on Sycamore and 14th St. in Wyandotte to Ohio, hoping that closer proximity to Ohio's steel mills and cheaper Ohio labor would help the company cut costs. The effort was not enough to prevent All Metal Products Company from going bankrupt in 1956, resulting in the sale of part of its product line, including the former Hafner trains, to competitor Louis Marx and Company. What remained of the company attempted a comeback in 1957 but failed.

Collectibles

Today "Wyandotte" toys are highly sought after collectibles, and since they were made mostly of metal many continue to survive today. The toy guns and airplanes produced before World War II were simply constructed from pressed metal and often painted in bright colors such as red, yellow, silver and olive green. Because of their simplicity these toys can often still be found in good condition. Toy guns with a science fiction theme are particularly desirable. These toys are only loosely based on actual guns and vehicles, and are often referred to today based on the vehicles to which they bear the closest resemblance. Wyandotte toys produced after World War II can be easily distinguished from pre-War toys by the elaborate lithograph markings that decorate them. These toys were manufactured using much thinner metal, and weigh less than the pre-War toys.

References

Toy companies of the United States
Model manufacturers of the United States
Toy cars and trucks
Companies based in Wayne County, Michigan
Manufacturing companies established in 1920
Wyandotte, Michigan
Manufacturing companies disestablished in 1957
1957 disestablishments in Ohio
1920 establishments in Michigan
Defunct manufacturing companies based in Michigan
Defunct manufacturing companies based in Ohio